Bheemini a Mandal in Mancherial district in the state of Telangana in India.

Administrative divisions
There are 21 Villages in Bheemini.

|22
|Mamidipalle
|23
|Chennapur

References 

Villages in Mancherial district
Mandal headquarters in Mancherial district

te:భీమిని